The King's Official Birthday (alternatively the Queen's Official Birthday when the monarch is female) is the selected day in most Commonwealth realms on which the birthday of the monarch is officially celebrated in those countries. It does not necessarily correspond to the date of the monarch's actual birth.

The sovereign's birthday was first officially marked in the Kingdom of Great Britain in 1748, for King George II. Since then, the date of the king or queen's birthday has been determined throughout the British Empire and, later, the Commonwealth of Nations, either by royal proclamations issued by the sovereign or viceroy, or by statute laws passed by the local parliament.

The date of the celebration today varies as adopted by each country and is generally set around the end of May or start of June, to coincide with a higher probability of fine weather in the Northern Hemisphere for outdoor ceremonies. In most cases, it is an official public holiday, sometimes aligning with the celebration of other events. Most Commonwealth realms release a Birthday Honours list at this time.

Australia
Australian states and territories observe the King's Birthday on the second Monday in June, except in Western Australia and Queensland. As Western Australia celebrates Western Australia Day (formerly known as Foundation Day) on the first Monday in June, the governor of Western Australia each year proclaims the day on which the state will observe the King's Birthday, based on school terms and the Perth Royal Show. There is no firm rule to determine this date, though it is usually the last Monday of September or the first Monday of October. Some regional areas of Western Australia celebrate the King's Birthday public holiday on alternative days for locally significant dates or events. In 2012, Queensland celebrated the holiday in October, as the June holiday was reserved to mark Elizabeth II's Diamond Jubilee as Queen of Australia, after which the holiday then for three years reverted to its traditional date in line with the other eastern Australian states. However, starting in 2016, Queensland celebrates the holiday on the first Monday of October.

Norfolk Island celebrates Bounty Day on 8 June, so King's Birthday is held on the Monday after the second Saturday in June. Christmas Island has other holidays and does not hold a King's Birthday holiday at all.

The day has been celebrated since 1788, when Governor Arthur Phillip declared a holiday to mark the birthday of the king of Great Britain. Until 1936, it was held on the actual birthday of the monarch, but, after King George V died, it was decided to keep the date on the second Monday in June. This has more evenly spaced out public holidays throughout the year. While George V's successor, Edward VIII, also celebrated his birthday in June, the three sovereigns since have not: George VI's birthday was in December, very close to public holidays for Christmas, Boxing Day, and New Years; Elizabeth II's birthday fell shortly after holidays for Good Friday and Easter and very close to ANZAC Day, while Charles III's birthday is in November, shortly after Remembrance Day.

The King's Birthday weekend and Empire Day (24 May) were the traditional times for public fireworks displays in Australia. The sale of fireworks to the public was banned in various states through the 1980s and by the Australian Capital Territory on 24 August 2009. Only Tasmania and the Northern Territory allow the sale of fireworks to the public. The King's Birthday Honours List, in which new members of the Order of Australia and other Australian honours are named, is released around the date of the King's Birthday.

Belize

Belize celebrates the birthday of the King annually in May. The day is known as Sovereign's Day, and is marked by parades in Belize City. Horse races, conducted by the National Sports Council, are held in Belize City's National Stadium and Orange Walk Town's People's Stadium. A cycling race, also arranged by the National Sports Council, is held between the cities of Belmopan and Cayo. There is a flag-raising ceremony among other events held at schools and universities to commemorate Sovereign's Day.

Canada

The sovereign's birthday had been observed in Canada since 1845, when the Legislative Assembly of the Province of Canada passed a statute to authorise the recognition of Queen Victoria's birthday, 24 May, as a public holiday. After Victoria died in 1901, 24 May became Victoria Day. The official date in Canada of the reigning monarch's birthday changed through various royal proclamations: for Edward VII, it continued by yearly proclamation to be observed on 24 May, but, was 3 June for George V and 23 June for Edward VIII (their actual birthdays).

Edward VIII abdicated on 11 December 1936, three days before the birthday of his brother and successor, George VI. The new King expressed to his ministers his wish that his birthday not be publicly celebrated, in light of the recent circumstances. However, the Prime Minister at the time, William Lyon Mackenzie King, the rest of Cabinet, and the Lord Tweedsmuir, the Governor General, felt otherwise, seeing such a celebration as a way to begin George's reign on a positive note. George VI's official birthday in Canada was thereafter marked on various days between 20 May and 14 June.

The first official birthday of Elizabeth II, daughter of George VI, was the last to be celebrated in June; the haphazard format was abandoned in 1952, when the Governor General-in-Council moved Empire Day and an amendment to the law moved Victoria Day both to the Monday before 25 May. The monarch's official birthday in Canada was by regular viceregal proclamations made to fall on this same date every year between 1953 and 1957, when a royal proclamation issued on 5 February established the Canadian monarch's official birthday as the last Monday before 25 May, making the link between Victoria Day and the sovereign's official birthday permanent.

The two holidays are in law entirely distinct except for being appointed to be observed on the same day; it is a general holiday in Nunavut and New Brunswick (there prescribed as a day of rest on which retail businesses must be closed). Though the media mention only Victoria Day and the public are therefore almost totally unaware of the existence of the official birthday, the sovereign's official birthday is marked by the firing of an artillery salute in the national and provincial capitals and the flying of the Royal Union Flag on buildings belonging to the federal Crown, if there is a second flag pole available.

The Canadian monarch has been in Canada for his or her official birthday twice: The first time was 20 May 1939, when King George VI was on a coast-to-coast tour of Canada and his official birthday was celebrated with a Trooping the Colour ceremony on Parliament Hill. The second time was when Queen Elizabeth II was in Canada from 17 to 25 May 2005, to mark the centennial of the entries of Saskatchewan and Alberta into Confederation; no government-initiated events, aside from those dictated by normal protocol, were organised to acknowledge the official birthday. Charles III, who was Prince of Wales and heir apparent to the throne at the time, and his wife, Camilla, in 2012 attended events in Saint John, New Brunswick, and Toronto, Ontario, marking the Queen's official birthday. In 2014, the couple attended a ceremony in Charlottetown, Prince Edward Island.

New Zealand
In New Zealand, the King's Birthday is a public holiday observed on the first Monday in June. Celebrations are mainly official, including the King's Birthday Honours list and military ceremonies. There have been proposals, with some political support, to replace the holiday with Matariki (Māori New Year) as an official holiday. In 2022, the Te Kāhui o Matariki Public Holiday Act declared Matariki as an official holiday separate from the Queen's Birthday, making said proposals obsolete. The idea of renaming the Queen's Birthday weekend to Hillary weekend, after mountaineer Sir Edmund Hillary, was raised in 2009.

Papua New Guinea
The King's Official Birthday is a public holiday in Papua New Guinea. In Papua New Guinea, it is usually celebrated on the second Monday of June every year. Official celebrations occur at hotels in Port Moresby, and much of the day is filled with sports matches, fireworks displays, and other celebrations and events. Honours and medals are given for public service to Papua New Guineans, who are mentioned in the King's Birthday Honours List.

Solomon Islands

The King's Official Birthday is a public holiday in Solomon Islands. In Solomon Islands, it is usually celebrated on the second Saturday of June every year. It is regarded as one of the most important events of the year in Solomon Islands. The day starts with the police marching band performing in the capital city of Honiara. Rallies are held all over the islands, which is followed by sporting events and custom dancing, and the celebrations and parties go long into the night.

The Governor-General of Solomon Islands delivers a speech on the King's Birthday, and honours and medals are given to those who have done valiant things and great service for Solomon Islands and its people.

Tuvalu
The King's Official Birthday is a public holiday in Tuvalu. In Tuvalu, it is usually celebrated on the second Saturday of June every year. Tuvaluans celebrate it with church services and prayers, singing "God Save the King" and "", flag hoisting, public speeches, a Royal Salute, and a parade. As the King's Birthday is a public holiday, all government offices, educational institutions, and most businesses are closed for the day.

, Tuvaluans also celebrated the birthday of the Charles, Prince of Wales, who at the time was heir to the Tuvaluan Throne. Heir to the Throne Day was a public holiday in November.

United Kingdom

The monarch's birthday has been celebrated in the United Kingdom since 1748, during the reign of King George II. Even when their real birthday was in May or June, the celebration was often on a different date. Edward VII, who reigned from 1901 to 1910 and whose birthday was on 9 November, moved his official birthday to summer, in the hope of good weather. King George VI, born on 14 December, celebrated his official birthday from 7 to 12 June. Queen Elizabeth II's official birthday was originally celebrated on a Thursday in late May or early June. However, this was changed in 1959, seven years after she became queen, and her Official Birthday was thenceforth celebrated on a Saturday (apart from 2022). From 1979 to 2017, it was the Saturday from 11 to 17 June (the 2nd Saturday, 8 to 14, of June was a myth).

The day is marked in London by the ceremony of Trooping the Colour, which is also known as the King's Birthday Parade. The list of Birthday Honours is also announced at the time of the Official Birthday celebrations. In British diplomatic missions, the day is treated as the national day of the United Kingdom. Although it is not celebrated as a specific public holiday in the UK, some civil servants are given a "privilege day" at this time of year, which is normally merged with the Spring bank holiday (last Monday in May) to create a four-day weekend.  The King's birthday is the last remaining privilege day, the other 1.5 days having been abolished in 2014 and replaced by a 1.5 day increase in civil servants' annual leave.

Parts of Scotland also mark Queen Victoria's birthday on the last Monday before or on 24 May.

British Overseas Territories
The King's official birthday is a public holiday in most British Overseas Territories, including Anguilla, the Cayman Islands, Gibraltar, Montserrat, Saint Helena, Ascension and Tristan da Cunha and the Turks and Caicos Islands. Bermuda formerly marked the occasion with a public holiday but in 2008 the Progressive Labour Party government of the territory decided the day would be, beginning the following year, replaced by National Heroes' Day, despite protests from some residents of the island, who signed a petition calling for retention of The King's Official Birthday. The Queen's Official Birthday continues, nonetheless, to be marked by a public parade on Front Street in the City of Hamilton, and by a Queen's Birthday Party at Government House. The Falkland Islands celebrate the actual day of King Charles III's birth, 14 November, as a public holiday.

Other Commonwealth countries
In Saint Kitts and Nevis, the date of the King's Official Birthday is set each year. The Cook Islands, a self-governing country in free association with New Zealand, also celebrates the holiday on the second Monday of June.

Despite Fiji abolishing the monarchy in 1987, following a second military coup d'état, the Queen's Birthday continued to be celebrated each 12 June until 2012. That year, the military government of Commodore Frank Bainimarama announced the holiday would be abolished, despite being a monarchist himself.

See also
 Day of the Sun (North Korea)
 Grand Duke's Official Birthday (Luxembourg)
 King's Feast (Belgium)
 Koningsdag (Netherlands)
 The Emperor's Birthday (Japan)

References

External links
 BBC News article of 2001 about the date of the Queen's Official Birthday in the UK
 The Queen's Birthday at the Royal Family website

Public holidays in Australia
Public holidays in Canada
Public holidays in New Zealand
Annual events in Canada
Annual events in the United Kingdom
Birthdays of heads of state
April observances
May observances
June observances
Types of national holidays
Holidays and observances by scheduling (nth weekday of the month)
Spring holidays (Northern Hemisphere)
Autumn holidays (Southern Hemisphere)
British monarchy
Commonwealth realms